This is a list of median household income in the United States by ethnicity and Native American tribal grouping (as of 2015) according to the United States Census. "Mixed race" and multi-ethnic categories are not listed.

By race and ethnicity
The United States Census has race and ethnicity as defined by the Office of Management and Budget in 1997. The following median household income data are retrieved from American Community Survey 2021 1-year estimates. In this survey, the nationwide population was 331,893,745 in 2021. The median household income in 2021 across the general population (all races and ethnicities included) was $69,717.

By detailed races

Asian Americans
In the 2021 American Community Survey, the following figures regarding detailed Asian ethnicities are reported.

Native Hawaiian and Other Pacific Islander
In the 2019 American Community Survey, the following figures regarding detailed Native Hawaiian and Other Pacific Islander races are reported.

American Indian and Alaska Native
In the 2014 American Community Survey, the following figures regarding 12 prominent American Indian and Alaska Native tribes are reported.

Detailed ancestry

See also
 List of ethnic groups in the United States by per capita income
 List of countries of birth by per capita income in the United States
 Racial pay gap in the United States

References 

United States
Income in the United States
United States demography-related lists